The Saint George Monastery cemetery (Greek: Agios Georgios Kontou) in Larnaca, Cyprus is an ancient cemetery.

An "Ancient Kition" text on a (governmental) roadsign, points toward this cemetery.

It is located on Agiou Georgiou Kontou Street.

External links
 
 

Cemeteries in Cyprus
Eastern Orthodox cemeteries